Jandu Hamoud (born 21 December 2001) is a cricketer who plays for the Kuwait national cricket team. He made his Twenty20 International (T20I) debut for Kuwait against Bahrain  on 23 January 2019 in the 2019 ACC Western Region T20 tournament. In July 2019, he was named in Kuwait's squad for the Regional Finals of the 2018–19 ICC T20 World Cup Asia Qualifier tournament. He played in Kuwait's match against Qatar on 26 July 2019, which Kuwait won by 10 runs.

References

External links
 

2001 births
Living people
Kuwaiti cricketers
Kuwait Twenty20 International cricketers
Place of birth missing (living people)